The Black Disciples (often abbreviated as the BD's, formerly BDN and BDN III) is a large street gang based in Chicago, Illinois, which received significant news coverage after the murder of one of their own members, an 11-year-old named Robert Sandifer.

History 

In 1958, a group of young teenagers from Hyde Park, Englewood, and Kenwood came together as friends to create an alliance to combat their enemies.  The founders—Richard Strong, David Barksdale, Mingo Shread, Prince Old Timer, Kilroy, Leonard Longstreet, Night Walker, and others—named their new organization the "Devil's Disciples."  By the beginning of 1961, David Barksdale, also known as "King David," took sole leadership of the Devil’s Disciples, and appointed different members to oversee various areas within the neighborhoods.

Barksdale's goal was to claim small gangs around the area, and turn them into factions of the Disciples. In 1966, in order to help increase recruitment and counteract threats from other gangs, David Barksdale created the “Black Disciples Nation,” which helped boost recruitment numbers into the thousands. 

In 1969, Larry Hoover, the leader of the rival gang “Gangster Disciples,” agreed to a merger with Barksdale to create a unified gang called the “Black Gangster Disciples Nation.”  

Soon after the alliance was formed, Larry Hoover and a member were charged and convicted for the murder of another member and received 150–200 years in prison. With Larry in prison, Barksdale was fully in charge of the gang. Barksdale later died due to kidney complications at the age of 27 on September 2, 1974.  

The death of Barksdale led to problems within the Black Gangster Disciple Nation (BGDN). The majority of the BGDN believed in becoming more unified after the passing of Barksdale, but some were opposed to the sentiment. The ideological differences led to the creation of two distinct factions: the "Black Gangsters Disciples" and the "Black Disciples." This brought about a rivalry between these two gangs, as there was bloodshed in the streets immediately after they were created.

Mickey Bull took over the Black Disciples, and made peace with the Gangster Disciples.  Bull’s leadership brought about a temporary lull in the violence, until he was murdered in the streets by Gangster Disciples in August 1991. Immediate backlash from Black Disciples culminated into a rampage, and three Gangster Disciples were killed on August 7, 1991. Between 1991 and 1994, the rivalry between the Gangster Disciples and Black Disciples intensified. The contentious rivalry came to an end after Marvell Thompson intervened.

Murder of Yummy 

Robert “Yummy” Sandifer joined the Black Disciples in 1994 at the age of 11 years old. He was given a 9mm semiautomatic pistol by his gang chief, and was sent out to kill some rival gang members. While aiming for his rivals, a stray bullet from Yummy's gun hit and killed a 14-year-old female pedestrian, Shavon Dean. This brought much-unwanted attention to the Black Disciples from local and national news. 

The gang leader sent out two brothers, Derrick Hardaway and Cragg Hardaway, to get rid of Yummy. The two brothers lured Yummy into an underpass, and shot him twice in the back of his head. They were later convicted of murder, and more undesired attention was brought upon the Black Disciples - despite their efforts to cover up the gang’s involvement.

Gang Structure 
The Black Disciples has over 300 sets, with around 30 to 40 members in each set.

See also 

 Gangs in Chicago
 Folk Nation

References 

Organizations established in 1966
1966 establishments in Illinois
African-American gangs
Folk Nation
Street gangs
African-American history in Chicago
Gangs in Chicago